The 1938 Cork Senior Hurling Championship was the 50th staging of the Cork Senior Hurling Championship since its establishment by the Cork County Board in 1887. The draw for the opening round fixtures took place at the Cork Convention on 30 January 1938. The championship began on 13 March 1938 and ended on 16 October 1938.

Glen Rovers were the defending champions.

On 16 October 1938, Glen Rovers won the championship following a 5-06 to 1-03 defeat of Midleton in the final. This was their fifth championship title and the fifth of eight successive championships.

Results

Divisional section

First round

Second round

Semi-finals

Final

Championship statistics

Miscellaneous

 Glen Rovers set a new record by becoming the first team to win five successive championship titles.
 Midleton qualify for the final for the first time since 1917.

References

Cork Senior Hurling Championship
Cork Senior Hurling Championship